The Fighting Stallion is a 1927 American silent Western film directed by Ben F. Wilson and starring Yakima Canutt and Neva Gerber.

Cast
 Yakima Canutt as Yak 
 Neva Gerber as Helen Gilmore 
 Al Ferguson as Steve Mays 
 Leonard Trainor as Frank Gilmore 
 Fred Gamble as Tubby 
 Bud Osborne as Chuck Lannigan

References

External links
 

1927 films
1927 Western (genre) films
Films directed by Ben F. Wilson
1920s English-language films
American black-and-white films
Silent American Western (genre) films
1920s American films